Maria Epiph Ikelap (born January 4, 1987 in Weno Island, Chuuk) is a track and field sprint athlete who competes internationally for the Federated States of Micronesia.

Ikelap represented Federated States of Micronesia at the 2008 Summer Olympics in Beijing. She competed at the 100 metres sprint and placed eighth in her heat without advancing to the second round. She ran the distance in a time of 13.73 seconds.

Achievements

References

External links
 
Sports reference biography

1987 births
Living people
People from Chuuk State
Federated States of Micronesia female sprinters
Olympic track and field athletes of the Federated States of Micronesia
Athletes (track and field) at the 2008 Summer Olympics
Olympic female sprinters